The Center for Asian Strategic Studies- India (CASS-India) is think tank that investigates strategic issues affecting India, Africa and Asia.  Headquartered in New Delhi, CASS-India is a non-government organization that was founded in 1999.

CASS-India researches and analyses issues involving military, defense, diplomacy, security, strategy, anti-piracy, and nuclear issues.

CASS-India has divided its research and professional area of expertise into seven different regions –South Asia, Central Asia, West Asia, South-East Asia, Indo-Pacific, Asia-Pacific region and Africa. It is primarily involved in general research, training and conferences. As of February 2014, the organization had organized more than 55 domestic conferences and 26 International conferences. As of 2014  CASS-India was focusing on the African-Asian region and particularly Africa. This campaign was expected to last three to four years.

CASS-India is a registered trust with a Board of Trustees. It is funded through self generated resources, grants, paid consultancy and custom project works. It has MoU's, institutional cooperation, special agreements and research partnerships with more than 30 organization worldwideacross the globe.

Area of expertise 
CASS-India works in the following areas:
 Military Security : Strategy, Doctrines, Modernization, Armament, Deployment & Procurement
 Diplomacy : Foreign Policy, Regional Groupings, Soft Power, Intra-region Policies
 Geo-Economics : Energy Security, Large Volume Trade, Trade Blocs, Hi-tech Trade
 Terrorism : Outfits, Movements, Training, Policies & Agenda, Patterns, Goals &Weapons
 Strategy : Strategy, International Relations, Politics, Government
 Trans-National Crime: Anti-Piracy Operations, Drug-trafficking, Money Laundering
 Non-Proliferation : NBC Warfare, Missile Defense, Nuclear Industry
 Non-Traditional Security Threats : Large-scale Migration, Climate Change, Food Security, etc.

Area of activities

International Training Program (ITP) 
Under the Advance Strategic Studies Course, CASS-India offers a crash-course to participants (Diplomats, military personnel, foreign policy experts and government officials) on issues relating to defence, strategy and military in the Afro-Asian region. This is usually held in November every year.

Overseas Training Program (OTP) 
CASS-India also conducts the program overseas for interested candidates. CASS-India takes its experts and works out a special training module for the interests of participants. The costs of the OTP are borne by the host institution/government. This is usually held in November every year.

Conference 
CASS-India organizes brain storming sessions and round table discussions,  seminars and interactive sessions and implements special projects for governments, institutions, individuals, companies and NGOs.

Research 
CASS-India trains and accepts research personnel from countries and established institutions under exchange programs. CASS-India also provides special research services for the Indian Ocean Region, Africa, China, Afghanistan and Energy Studies.

Establishment 
CASS-India is a registered trust and a private and independent think-tank. 
It was established in March 1999 and came into effect in March 2002. It is funded through self-generated resources, grants, paid consultancies and custom projects.

References

https://web.archive.org/web/20120221020357/http://www.cassindia.com/AboutUs.aspx
http://defenceforumindia.com/foreign-relations/19097-india-qatar-strategic-ties-cass-india.html
http://www.asiastudies.org/

Foreign policy and strategy think tanks in India